In mathematics, the branching theorem is a theorem about Riemann surfaces. Intuitively, it states that every non-constant holomorphic function is locally a polynomial.

Statement of the theorem

Let  and  be Riemann surfaces, and let  be a non-constant holomorphic map. Fix a point  and set .
 ; and
  is 

This theorem gives rise to several definitions:
Some authors denote this .
 If  has no branch points, it is called unbranched. See also unramified morphism.

References 
.

Theorems in complex analysis
Riemann surfaces